In molecular biology, the ferric uptake regulator family is a family of bacterial proteins involved in regulating metal ion uptake and in metal homeostasis. The family is named for its founding member, known as the ferric uptake regulator or ferric uptake regulatory protein (Fur). Fur proteins are responsible for controlling the intracellular concentration of iron in many bacteria. Iron is essential for most organisms, but its concentration must be carefully managed over a wide range of environmental conditions; high concentrations can be toxic due to the formation of reactive oxygen species.

Function 
Members of the ferric uptake regulator family are transcription factors that primarily exert their regulatory effects as repressors: when bound to their cognate metal ion, they are capable of binding DNA and preventing expression of the genes they regulate, but under low concentrations of metal, they undergo a conformational change that prevents DNA binding and lifts the repression. In the case of the ferric uptake regulator protein itself, its immediate downstream target is a noncoding RNA called RyhB.

In addition to the ferric uptake regulator protein, members of the Fur family are also involved in maintaining homeostasis with respect to other ions:
 Mur, responsive to manganese.
 Nur, responsive to nickel.
 PerR, responsive to peroxide; PerR monomers contain two binding sites and occur in zinc/iron and zinc/manganese forms.
 Zur, responsive to zinc; Zur regulates uptake and transport through a regulon involving ZinT and the transporter ZnuABC.
Irr, responsive to iron through the status of heme biosynthesis. Has both activator and repressor function. Prevalent in Rhizobium, Bradyrhizobium and many other alphaproteobacteria.

The iron dependent repressor family is a functionally similar but non-homologous family of proteins involved in iron homeostasis in prokaryotes.

Relationship to virulence
Metal homeostasis can be a factor in bacterial virulence, an observation with a particularly long history in the case of iron. In some cases, expression of virulence factors is under the regulatory control of the Fur protein.

References 

Protein families